Edward D. Suech (1903 – February 13, 1977) was an American football, basketball, and baseball coach and college athletics administrator. He served as the head football coach at Saint Mary's College—now known as Saint Mary's University of Minnesota—in Winona, Minnesota from 1939 to 1947, compiling a record of 24–36–1. Suech was also the head basketball coach at Saint Mary's from 1939 to 1948, amassing a record of 97–68, the school's head baseball coach in 1940, tallying a mark of 2–9, and the athletic director at Saint Mary's from 1939 to 1948.

Suech attended Duluth Cathedral High School in Duluth, Minnesota. He was captain of the basketball team in 1922–23 and a teammate of Joe Benda. Suech later played football and basketball at Superior State Teachers College—now known as University of Wisconsin–Superior. He was appointed basketball coach at Duluth Cathedral in 1931.

Suech came to Saint Mary's in 1939 after coaching football and basketball for three years at Cretin High School in Saint Paul, Minnesota.

Suech died at the age of 77, on February 13, 1977, at Valley View Hospital in Youngtown, Arizona.

Head coaching record

College football

References

External links
 

1903 births
1977 deaths
Saint Mary's Cardinals athletic directors
Saint Mary's Cardinals baseball coaches
Saint Mary's Redmen football coaches
Saint Mary's Cardinals men's basketball coaches
High school basketball coaches in Minnesota
High school football coaches in Minnesota
Wisconsin–Superior Yellowjackets football players
Wisconsin–Superior Yellowjackets men's basketball players
Sportspeople from Duluth, Minnesota
Coaches of American football from Minnesota
Players of American football from Minnesota
Basketball coaches from Minnesota
Baseball players from Minnesota